The Serpentine Similar is the debut studio album by American indie rock band Gastr del Sol, released on June 1, 1993 by TeenBeat Records. The album was re-released by Drag City on June 16, 1997.

Background
Guitarist David Grubbs and drummer John McEntire had played together in the post-hardcore band Bastro with bassist Clark Johnson. When Johnson left Bastro in 1991 to attend law school, Bundy K. Brown joined and the group began writing new material, later documented as the instrumental live album Antlers: Live 1991. These songs were then reworked as quieter, acoustic versions for The Serpentine Similar as Bastro became Gastr del Sol.

Track listing

Personnel
Adapted from The Serpentine Similar liner notes.

Gastr del Sol
 Bundy K. Brown – instruments
 David Grubbs – instruments
Additional musicians
 John McEntire – additional percussion

Production and additional personnel
 Michael O'Bannon – cover art
 Brian Paulson – production, recording

Release history

References

External links
 

1993 debut albums
Gastr del Sol albums
Albums produced by Brian Paulson
Drag City (record label) albums
TeenBeat Records albums